Mauro Adrián Vila Wilkins (born 23 February 1986 in Montevideo, Uruguay), known as Mauro Vila, is a Uruguayan footballer currently playing for Universidad Técnica de Cajamarca of the Torneo Descentralizado in Chile.

Teams
  Defensor Sporting 2005–2009
  Querétaro 2009–2010
  Indios de Ciudad Juárez 2010
  Defensor Sporting 2011
  Almirante Brown 2011–2012
  Deportivo Quito 2012
  Universidad Técnica de Cajamarca 2013–2015
  Boston River 2016-

Notes

External links
 
 
 
 
 Profile at Tenfield Digital  

1986 births
Living people
Uruguayan footballers
Uruguayan expatriate footballers
Defensor Sporting players
Club Almirante Brown footballers
S.D. Quito footballers
Querétaro F.C. footballers
Indios de Ciudad Juárez footballers
Universidad Técnica de Cajamarca footballers
Rampla Juniors players
Boston River players
Uruguayan Primera División players
Liga MX players
Peruvian Primera División players
Expatriate footballers in Argentina
Expatriate footballers in Mexico
Expatriate footballers in Ecuador
Expatriate footballers in Peru
Association football forwards